By-elections to for the French National Assembly are held within three months after the invalidation of the election or resignation of a deputy. No by-elections are held within the twelve months of the end of a parliamentary cycle. Eight by-elections have been called since the inauguration of the 16th legislature of the French Fifth Republic.

List

See also 

 List of by-elections to the National Assembly (France)

References 

2022 elections in France
2023 elections in France